Don Candy (31 March 1929 – 14 June 2020) was an Australian tennis player who was mainly successful in doubles.

At the Grand Slam tournaments he reached the quarterfinals of the Australian Championships singles event in 1952 and 1959. In the singles event at the French Championships he reached the eighth-finals in 1956 and 1960.

In June 1951 Candy won the singles title at the Kent Championships, a grass court tournament held in Beckenham, defeating Gardnar Mulloy in three sets. The next year, 1952, he again reached the Kent final but on this occasion lost in three sets to Ham Richardson. In July 1951 he won the Midlands counties men's singles title after a straight sets victory in the final against Naresh Kumar from India.

In 1956 he won the Men's Doubles title at the French Championships. With his American partner Bob Perry he won against compatriots Ashley Cooper and Lew Hoad in three straight sets.

After his active career he moved to Baltimore in 1967 where he coached the World Team Tennis Baltimore Banners and later became the coach of Pam Shriver. In 2022 Shriver disclosed that she had been in a multi-year relationship with Candy, that started when she was a young player.

Grand Slam finals

Doubles (1 title, 6 runners-up)

References

External links
 
 
 Australian Open Player Profile

1929 births
2020 deaths
Australian Championships (tennis) junior champions
Australian male tennis players
French Championships (tennis) champions
Grand Slam (tennis) champions in men's doubles
Tennis people from South Australia
Grand Slam (tennis) champions in boys' singles
Grand Slam (tennis) champions in boys' doubles
20th-century Australian people